The Munich Chamber Orchestra (or MKO) is a German chamber orchestra based in Munich. Its primary concert venue is the Prinzregententheater, Munich.

History 
Christoph Stepp founded the MKO in 1950. Hans Stadlmair was the artistic director from 1956 to 1995, and conducted the orchestra in over 4000 concerts, including international tours and collaborations with the Bayerischer Rundfunk. From 1995 to 2006, Christoph Poppen was principal conductor of the MKO.  has been the principal conductor and artistic director from 2006 until 2016. Clemens Schuldt has been principal conductor since the 2016/17 season.

The MKO has regularly commissioned music from such contemporary composers as Erkki-Sven Tüür, Georg Friedrich Haas, Thomas Larcher, Iannis Xenakis and Wolfgang Rihm, among others. In 1971 the orchestra premiered Wilhelm Killmayer's fin al punto, composed for its 20th anniversary. The MKO and the Philharmonie Essen commissioned Jörg Widmann's ad absurdum, Concerto for trumpet in B and small orchestra, which premiered on 18 January 2006 with soloist Sergei Nakariakov. In 2010 the orchestra premiered Peter Ruzicka's TRANS.

Awards 
The MKO was awarded the Musikpreis der Landeshauptstadt München in 2000, the prize for the best concert programming from the Deutscher Musikverleger-Verband (German association of music publishers) for the seasons 2001/02 and 2005/06, the Cannes Classical Award in 2002, the Prize of the Christoph and Stephan Kaske Foundation in 2002 with Christoph Poppen, the Ernst von Siemens Förderpreis in 2001 to 2003. In 2008, the Bayerische Akademie der Schönen Künste awarded the prize Neues Hören (New Listening) of the foundation Neue Musik im Dialog (New Music Dialogue) for the successful delivery of contemporary music to the chamber orchestra.

Selected recordings 

Karl Amadeus Hartmann: Funèbre, with Isabelle Faust (violin), Paul Meyer, Petersen String Quartet, conducted by Christoph Poppen, ECM New Series (2000)
 Sofia Gubaidulina: Sieben Worte / Zehn Präludien / De Profundis, with Elsbeth Moser (bayan), Boris Pergamentschikow (cello), conducted by Christoph Poppen ECM New Series (2002)
 Bach / Webern: Ricercar, including Bach cantata Christ lag in Todes Banden, BWV 4, with the Hilliard Ensemble, conducted by Christoph Poppen, ECM New Series (2003)
 Tigran Mansurian: Monodia, with Kim Kashkashian, Leonidas Kavakos, Jan Garbarek, Hilliard Ensemble, conducted by Christoph Poppen, ECM New Series (2004)
 Barry Guy: Folio, with Maya Homburger (baroque violin), Muriel Cantoreggi (violin), Barry Guy (double bass), conducted by Christoph Poppen, ECM New Series (2005)
 Giacinto Scelsi: Natura Renovatur, with Frances-Marie Uitti, conducted by Christoph Poppen, ECM New Series (2006)
 Valentyn Sylvestrov: Bagatellen und Serenaden, with Valentyn Sylvestrov and Alexei Lubimov (piano), conducted by Christoph Poppen, ECM New Series (2007)
 Haydn / Yun: Farewell conducted by Alexander Liebreich ECM New Series (2008)
 Neharót, works of Betty Olivero, Tigran Mansurian, Komitas and Eitan Steinberg, with Kim Kashkashian, conducted by Alexander Liebreich ECM New Series (2009)
 Madhares, works of Thomas Larcher for piano and orchestra with Till Fellner, for viola and chamber orchestra with Kim Kashkashian, conducted by Dennis Russell Davies ECM New Series (2010)
 Toshio Hosokawa: Landscape, with Mayumi Miyata (shō), conducted by Alexander Liebreich ECM New Series (2011)
 Fauré: Requiem, with Chor des Bayerischen Rundfunks, conducted by Peter Dijkstra Sony Classical (2011), rewarded with ECHO KLASSIK 2012
 Rossini: Ouvertures, conducted by Alexander Liebreich Sony Classical (2011)
 Der Charme der Oboe, works of Cimarosa, Bellini etc., with François Leleux (oboe), Daniel Giglberger (concertmaster) Sony Classical (2012)
 Nikolaus Brass: Zeit im Grund / Von wachsender Gegenwart, with Beate Zelinsky, David Smeyers (clarinet), conducted by Alexander Liebreich NEOS (2013)
 W. A. Mozart: Great Mass in C minor, K. 427, with Chor des Bayerischen Rundfunks, conducted by Peter Dijkstra Sony Classical (2013)
 W. A. Mozart: Requiem, with Chor des Bayerischen Rundfunks, conducted by Alexander Liebreich Sony Classical (2014)
 W. A. Mozart: Flötenkonzerte, with Magali Mosnier (flute), Daniel Giglberger (concertmaster) Sony Classical (2015)
 Mendelssohn: Sommernachtstraum / Symphony No. 4, with Chor des Bayerischen Rundfunks, conducted by Alexander Liebreich Sony Classical (2015)
 Haydn / Hummel: Prince Esterházy Concertos, with François Leleux (oboe), Daniel Giglberger (concertmaster) Sony Classical (2015)
 Cello Concertos by Haydn / W. A. Mozart/Cassadó, C.P.E. Bach, with Valentin Radutiu (cello), conducted by Stephan Frucht hänssler classic (2016)
 Anton & Paul Wranitzky with Veriko Tchumburidze (violin), Chiara Enderle (cello), conducted by Howard Griffiths Sony Classical 2016
 Tigran Mansurian: Requiem, with RIAS Kammerchor, Alexander Liebreich ECM New Series (2017)
 Franz Danzi, with Nareh Arghamanyan (piano), Aurélien Pascal (cello), conducted by Howard Griffiths Sony Classical / BR-Klassik 2017
 Milica Djordjević: rocks – stars – metals – light, i.a. conducted by Clemens Schuldt, col legno / BR-Klassik (2017)
 Concertante! Les Vents Français, Daniel Giglberger (concertmaster) Warner Classics / BR-Klassik (2018)

Principal conductors
 Hans Stadlmair (1956–1995)
 Christoph Poppen (1995–2006)
 Alexander Liebreich (2006–2016)
 Clemens Schuldt (2016–present)

References

External links

Clemens Schuldt official website

Münchener Kammerorchester (Chamber Orchestra) bach-cantatas.com
Münchener Kammerorchester unter Christoph Poppen mit dem Preis für das Beste Konzertprogramm der Saison ausgezeichnet Deutscher Musikverleger-Verband, 22 May 2006 

Chamber orchestras
Chamber Orchestra
Chamber Orchestra
String orchestras
ECM Records artists
1950 establishments in West Germany
Musical groups established in 1950